Jay Lively Activity Center is an ice arena and skating center in Flagstaff, Arizona. It is home to the Northern Arizona Lumberjacks men's ice hockey team.

Naming
Jay Lively Activity Center is named in honor of local ice hockey player Jay Lively who died in a car crash.

History
Jay Lively Activity Center opened in 1971 under the name "Flagstaff Ice Arena" until 1985 when the name was changed to honor Jay Lively.

In 1977 NAU left the arena to play NCAA D-I ice hockey inside the new Walkup Skydome but returned in 1985 after NAU dropped support for the hockey program due to the ice system in the Skydome falling into disrepair.

In 2010 the roof collapsed due to snow buildup after a four-day blizzard.

References

Indoor ice hockey venues in the United States
College ice hockey venues in the United States

1971 establishments in Arizona
Sports venues completed in 1971